Aruppukkottai taluk is a taluk of Virudhunagar district of the Indian state of Tamil Nadu. The headquarters of the taluk is the town of Aruppukkottai.

Demographics
According to the 2011 census, the taluk of Aruppukkottai had a population of 248,186 with 123,337 males and 124,849 females. There were 1,012 women for every 1,000 men. The taluk had a literacy rate of 77.3%. Child population in the age group below 6 years were 11,668 Males and 11,087 Females.

References 

Taluks of Virudhunagar district